Dr. Richard Wayne (April 4, 1804 – June 27, 1858) served as mayor of Savannah, Georgia for four terms:  1844 - 1845,  1848–1851, 1852–1853 and 1857 - 1858.  He died while in office.

Wayne was the first mayor of Savannah elected by its citizens.  Prior to his election, mayors were appointed by the city aldermen.  He is buried in Savannah's Laurel Grove Cemetery.

References
 Gamble, Thomas, Jr., A History of the City Government of Savannah, Ga., from 1790 to 1901, pp. 47–48.
 Gamble, All the Ordinances of the City of Savannah, 1858, p. 318.

External links
 

1804 births
1858 deaths
Mayors of Savannah, Georgia
19th-century American politicians